Dnipro Medical Institute of Traditional and Nontraditional Medicine (Ukrainian: Дніпровський медичний інститут традиційної і нетрадиційної медицини) is the only nonprofit, fully accredited, private University in Dnipro, Ukraine.

Overview
Dnipro Medical Institute of Conventional and Alternative Medicine, also known as Dnipro Medical Institute of Traditional and Non-Traditional Medicine (or in Ukrainian Dnepropetrovskij Medicinskij Institute) offers Medicine and Dentistry courses in English for international students. Dnipro Medical Institute of Conventional and Alternative Medicine.

The Group for International Students Assessment (GISA) found that 98.7% of international students in Dnipro Medical Institute agreed with the statement "I am overall satisfied with the quality of the medical course." The university ranks 3409 in the world for its "Medicine in English" course. Each intake has the capacity for 100 new international students. The university offers intakes in September and February.

History
Dnipro Medical Institute of Conventional and Alternative Medicine was founded by the previous dean of the state medical school in Dnipro. The dean had a vision for a revolutionary university that would play a central role in training world-class international doctors. The dean was tied down by bureaucracy, so the change was slow and sometimes stagnant. The dean and a few other heads of departments decided to form their own private university.

References 

Universities and colleges in Dnipro
Medical schools in Ukraine
Educational institutions established in 1993
1993 establishments in Ukraine